Ferdinard Ndungu Waititu, also known as Baba Yao, is a Kenyan politician who served as the second governor of Kiambu County from 2016 to January 2020. He was impeached on corruption charges. His troubles started after it was learnt he was involved in a scheme of grabbing land from a widow worth over one million dollars amongst other fraudulent activities. He is currently awaiting trial for the mismanagement of county fund of over five million dollars.  He also served as an assistant minister for Water Services and Irrigation in the government of Kenya.

Following graft charges leveled against him, Waititu was Impeached and lost his seat as the Governor of Kiambu County on January 29, 2020, through a trial by the Kenya Senate despite intense lobbying by some members of parliament.

In August 2017 Waititu was elected as the Jubilee Party Nominee for Governor position in Kiambu County after defeating the incumbent Governor of Kiambu County Hon. William Kabogo

Education

Waititu completed his secondary school in 1981 from Dagoretti High School, where he obtained the Kenya Certificate of Education. He then proceeded to Technical University of Kenya, formerly known as the Kenya Polytechnic, before proceeding to Delhi, India, where he obtained a degree in commerce from Sri Guru Gobind Singh College of Commerce in 1991.

Social/political life

He is described as a "fiery politician" and has been arrested on several occasions, including for "hate speech" directed against ethnic Maasai and for protesting the demolition of shanty houses in his district. In September 2012 he was suspended from his government post over charges of hate speech and inciting violence.  In 2014 the High court ruled that Waititu is unfit to hold public office due to integrity issues. In 2015 he was elected MP.

He is often referred to as 'Baba yao' (Kiswahili for 'Their father'). He lost the Nairobi gubernatorial election to Dr. Evans Kidero in March 2013. Fedinard Waititu however found a way back to active politics on 4 May 2015 after winning a seat as a member of parliament for Kabete through a by election following death of the area MP George Muchai who was murdered in the streets of Nairobi. The landslide win united him with his long term political friend Mike Sonko but in different fields of politics. However, he officially announced to run for gubernatorial seat for Kiambu to battle it out with Governor William Kabogo come next general elections. He won the gubernatorial election for Kiambu county defeating William Kabogo. He served as Kiambu County governor from 2017 until 2020 when he was impeached on corruption charges. In 2021, he declared that he would gun for the gubernatorial seat in Nairobi County once again.

References

External links
 Interview with Ferdinand Waititu by Africa Today

....

Living people
1962 births
Members of the National Assembly (Kenya)